Edward Black (18 August 1900, Birmingham – 30 November 1948, London) was a British film producer, best known for being head of production at Gainsborough Studios in the late 1930s and early 1940s, during which time he oversaw production of the Gainsborough melodramas. He also produced such classic films as The Lady Vanishes (1938). Black has been called "one of the unsung heroes of the British film industry" and "one of the greatest figures in British film history, the maker of stars like Margaret Lockwood, James Mason, John Mills and Stewart Granger. He was also one of the very few producers whose films, over a considerable period, made money." In 1946 Mason called Black "the one good production executive" that J. Arthur Rank had. Frank Launder called Black "a great showman and yet he had a great feeling for scripts and spent more time on them than anyone I have ever known. His experimental films used to come off as successful as his others."

Black specialized in making comedies, thrillers and low-budget musicals. He had a lot of success making comedy vehicles for stars such as Will Hay and Arthur Askey. He also produced early films from Carol Reed and Alfred Hitchcock and was an early supporter of writer directors Sidney Gilliat and Frank Launder.

Early life
Black was the third son of George Black, a property master at the Theatre Royal, Birmingham, who became a cinema owner. George Black became a manager of a touring waxworks show then travelling cinema; in 1905 he set up the Monkwearmouth Picture Hall in Sounderland - this was one of the first permanent cinemas in Britain. He bought two more before he died in 1910.

His and his sons Ted, George and Alfred built up the cinema to a circuit of thirteen cinemas in the Tyneside area. In 1919 they sold them and set about establishing another circuit. In 1928 they told this to the General Theatre Corporation. When that was taken over by Gaumont-British, Ted became a cinema circuit manager. In 1930 he went into production.

Gaumont British
In 1930 Black became an assistant production manager at Shepherd’s Bush and then studio manager at Islington.

In 1935 he and Sidney Gilliat were associate producers on Tudor Rose. Black then took over the running of Islington studios.

Gainsborough
In December 1936, Michael Balcon left Gaumont-British for MGM. In March 1937 Shepherd’s Bush studios and Gaumont-British Distributors were closed. However Gainsborough continued as a production center thanks to a deal with C.M. Woolf and J. Arthur Rank’s General Film Distributors. Black was in charge along with Maurice Ostrer. They made movies for Gainsborough and 20th Century Fox.

According to Robert Murphy, "Black concentrated on making films for British audiences. Like his brother George at the London Palladium, Ted had an almost superstitious faith in his ability to divine popular taste and was wary about involving himself with anything that might dilute it."

Alfred Roome, a film editor at Gainsborough, said: "We often wondered why Ted Black didn’t mix with the elite of his profession. I don’t think he ever went to a premiere, star parties and the like. One day he explained his apparent aloofness. He said he didn’t want to get contaminated by people outside his band of entertainment. 'If I mix with the intellectual lot, it’ll impair my judgement', he said."

Black helped promote new stars like Margaret Lockwood, Michael Redgrave and Phyllis Calvert. He also employed variety performers like Will Hay, Will Fyffe and The Crazy Gang, and the comedian Arthur Askey. When asked why he signed Lockwood to a long term contract Black said "she has something with which every girl in the suburbs can identify herself."

Black was very strong in promoting writers. Frank Launder said: "Ted believed in writers. To him the screenplay was the be-all and end- all. He enjoyed script conferences and went in for them wholesale, which made it pretty arduous going for the script editor as well as the writers and directors."

In January 1939, Gaumont signed a deal with 20th Century Fox.

World War Two
With the advent of World War Two, Black arranged for Gainsborough to move from Islington to Shepherd's Bush. He had Gaumont make more comedies such as Band Waggon.

In the words of one writer, Black "held the studio together during its most difficult period, backed Laundner and Gilliat in establishing a strong script department, retained the services of some of the best cameramen in the business, and put under contract a number of promising actors."

He worked with actor George Arliss on Doctor Syn. In 1940, Arliss wrote about Black:
 He is so entirely unlike a movie boss: he doesn’t seem to interfere with anyone. It is only by degrees you find out that he has everything under his hand and that he really directs the movements of every department. He is very like a mere businessman, one who believes that it is of no use to lay in a stock of goods that can never produce any return; and that the making of canned pictures should be controlled with the Kune care as the preparation of any other earned goods intended for public consumption. Unless I am much mistaken, Edward Black is going to show us how pictures made in England can be made to pay.

Launder and Gilliat
Black was an advocate of Launder and Gilliat as writers, working with them on The Lady Vanishes (1938) and Night Train to Munich (1940). He gave them their first opportunity as directors.

Gainsborough melodramas
Black produced the first Gainsborough melodrama, The Man in Grey (1943) directed by Leslie Arliss. The movie was a huge success, making stars out of its four leads, Margaret Lockwood, James Mason, Stewart Granger and Phyllis Calvert. Black followed it with Fanny By Gaslight, with Calvert, Mason, Granger and Jean Kent, directed by Anthony Asquith.

Black's relationship with Maurice Ostrer was not always easy and he also clashed with the Rank Organisation when they took over Gainsborough. In 1944, Black left Gainsborough to join Alexander Korda. His contract was worth a reported £15,000 a year.<ref? Wood p 150</ref>

Last films and death
Black made two films for Korda, A Man About the House (1947) and Bonnie Prince Charlie (1948), which was a commercial failure. Black died of lung cancer on 30 November 1948 at the age of 48, shortly after the premiere of the second film. 

He was planning to make a film about the police force, To Watch and to Ward. According to Alan Wood "he worked and smoked himself to death".

Partial filmography

Leslie Arliss (director)
 The Man in Grey (1943)
 A Man About the House (1947)

Arthur Askey (star)
Band Waggon (1940)
Charley's (Big-Hearted) Aunt (1940)
The Ghost Train (1941)
I Thank You (1941)
Back-Room Boy (1942)
King Arthur Was a Gentleman (1942)
 Miss London Ltd. (1943)
Bees in Paradise (1944)

Anthony Asquith (director)
 Uncensored (1942)
 We Dive at Dawn (1943)
 Fanny by Gaslight (1944)

The Crazy Gang (stars)
 O-Kay for Sound (1937)
Alf's Button Afloat (1938) with Flanagan and Allan
The Frozen Limits (1939)
 Gasbags (1941)

Will Fyffe (star)
Said O'Reilly to McNab (1937) with Will Mahoney
Owed Bob (1938) aka To the Victor with Margaret Lockwood
They Came by Night (1940)
For Freedom (1940)
Neutral Port (1940)

Tommy Handley (star)
It's That Man Again (1943)
Time Flies (1944)

Gordon Harker/Alastair Sim (stars)
Inspector Hornleigh (1938)
Inspector Hornleigh on Holiday (1939)
Inspector Hornleigh Goes To It (US: Mail Train, 1941)
Cottage to Let (without Harker, 1941)
Once a Crook (1941)

Will Hay (star)
Boys Will Be Boys (1935)
Where There's a Will (1936)
 Good Morning, Boys (1937)
 Oh, Mr Porter! (1937)
 Convict 99 (1938)
Old Bones of the River (1938)
Hey! Hey! USA (1938)
 Ask a Policeman (1939)
 Where's That Fire? (1940)

Alfred Hitchcock (director)
Young and Innocent (1937)
 The Lady Vanishes (1938) with Lockwood

Alexander Korda (co-producer)
Bonnie Prince Charlie (1948)

Launder and Gilliat (director/producers)
Partners in Crime (1942)
Millions Like Us (1943)
2,000 Women (1944)
Waterloo Road (1944)

Carol Reed (director)
Bank Holiday (1938) with Margaret Lockwood 
A Girl Must Live (1939) with Lockwood
 Night Train to Munich (1940) with Margaret Lockwod and Rex Harrison
The Girl in the News (1941) with Margaret Lockwood
Kipps (1941)
A Letter from Home (1941)
The Young Mr. Pitt (1942)

Robert Stevenson (director)
Tudor Rose (1936)
The Man Who Changed His Mind (1936)

Tom Walls (star)
 Strange Boarders (1938)
 Crackerjack (1938) aka Man with 1000 Faces

Shorts
Rush Hour (1941)
 Mr. Proudfoot Shows a Light (1941)

Other
Everybody Dance (1936)
 Doctor Syn (1937) with George Arliss and Margaret Lockwood
 Hi Gang! (1941)
Dear Octopus (1944)
Give Us the Moon (1944)

References

Notes

External links 
 

1900 births
1948 deaths
English film producers
People from Birmingham, West Midlands
20th-century English businesspeople